Haupe Liyanage Athukorala Morris Joseph Ranabahu, (born 18 May 1938 – died 29 October 2001), popularly as Freddie Silva, was a Sri Lankan film actor, and playback singer, who appeared from 1973 until 2002. Freddie was known for being one of the most popular Sri Lankan comedians of the 1960s, 1970s and 1980s. He appeared in over 400 films and Produced 2 films, of which 300 were screened at the celebration of fifty years in Sinhala Cinema.

Early life 
Silva was born on 18 May 1938 in Puvakaramba, Moratuwa, Sri Lanka as the only child of the family. Silva's father was an overseer for the Moratuwa Urban Council and his mother was a member of Salvation Army. Growing up he was fascinated with singing and dancing. St. Sebastian's College was his Alma mater.

Music career 
In the 1950s Silva performed the Alanson Mendis composition "Bar Bar Bar" in front of Sir John Kotelawala and was warmly received. He used this opportunity to get a letter of recommendation from Kotelawala which he presented to Livy Wijemanne of Radio Ceylon to secure a job as a radio artist.

Silva's first recording was "Mottapala." He followed the song with "Bar Bar Bar" now updated with music by P. L. A. Somapala. It was a success. Subsequent efforts teamed Silva with the late Premakirthi de Alwis. Their work include comedic songs like "Aron Mama", "Pankiritta", "Nedeyo", "Handa Mama", "Kekille Rajjuruwo" and "Parana Coat" (from Lokuma Hinawa). Silva's crowning achievement is considered the tune "Kundumani."

Acting career
Silva got his first screen role through a chance meeting with K. A. W. Perera in 1963. At that time he was living with H. R. Jothipala and Roy de Silva and frequented parties as a guest entertainer. Perera cast Silva in Suhada Sohoyuro alongside L. S. Ramachandran and Vijitha Mallika. He appeared at a dance on the beach singing "Diya Rella Werale Hapi Hapi" with Pushparani and went on to be cast in mainly comedic roles.

The serious side of Silva was seen in Sekaya (1965), Lasanda (1974) and Sukiri kella (1975). In the 1975 film he played a mentally handicapped character and in preparation for the role lived with a real handicapped boy in Koralawella.

By the 1980s, producers were reluctant to make a film without Silva fearing that the movie would flop. He was then living an extravagant life and saved little. In 1989 Silva was awarded the Ranathisara award by leading film weekly Sarasaviya. A turning moment came when his friend Vijaya Kumaratunga (who he appeared alongside in ten films the last being Yukthiyada Shakthiyada) was murdered. He cites this event as leading to the downfall of cinema. Still Silva stayed busy appearing in 15 of the 26 films made in 1992.

Personal life
Freddie Silva was a father of two children from his only marriage to Kamala Swarnalatha Prera. His son Janesh Silva was also an actor and a singer.> Freddie's  daughter Chandani Silva is a singer and actress. She is currently working to keep his father and brother's legacy.

Janesh Silva was born on 26 January 1962 and attended to Carey College for studies. He was married to Hemamala and they have one son Janith Silva. Janesh died on June 10, 2012 while he was taking medical treatment for cancer. Janesh Silva is known as a comedian that acted in 10+ films.

Freddie Silva died on 29 October 2001 in Siddamulla at the age of 63.

Filmography

As Producer

Songs

 Aachchi Podi Wedawarjanayak
 Aappa Weladaamey Umba - with Kalawathee
 Aaraadhitha Amuththek (Vikata Rasaanga) - with Gemunu Wijesuriya
 Aaron Maama
 Aaronge Malli Baaron
 Aawaa Mey Mama - with Anjaleen Gunathilake
 Ahanna Balanna
 Aladinge Puduma Pahana - with Nihal Nelson 
 Allapu Gedarin
 Aluth Kathawak
 Aluth Kalaawak
 Amuthu Adum ada
 Anangaya Anangaya - with Anjaleen Gunathilake
 Amuthu Sathaa 
 Andare
 Andare Mehe Waren - with Desmond De Silva
 Anna Hande Haawa
 Api Kaatada Baya - with H.R. Jothipala
 Arabiye Thele
 Arulu Burulu
 Ata Sakilla Waage
 Athaka Selawena
 Athadunna Hithawanthi
 Aththa Yukthiyata
 Au Au Au Au Mage Sawarina
 Ayiya Saami - with Kalawathee 
 Baanumathi
 Bachna Bachana
 Balla Balla
 Ballan Biruwata
  Ballata Ethiwedakuthne 
 Bam Manna
 Bar Eken Beela
 Bara Karaththe
 Batakola Wattiyakata - with Kalawathiee
 Beela Beela
 Blade Thaley
 Bombay Sundaree
 Bola Kadala Seeni Kadala - with Kalawathee
 Boru Manasgaatha Noweyi
 Bulath Wadiyak
 Buruthu Buruthu Mal
 Buuru Naamba
 Chandrase Kelum
 Cheriyo Kiyala Me - with Gration Ananda
 Cheene Indalaa Aawe - with Kalawathee
 Chi Chi Chi
 Chimpanci Putha 
 Chin Chin Nona - with H. R. Jothipala and Milton Perera
 Dannawu Rata Pawathenna Wu
 Dawasak Daa Kakuluwekuta
 Deweta Dige Man Awa
 Dil Thadap Thadap (Illagena Kana Parippu)
 Diya Yata Wiskam
 Duka Wanasana Sepa - with Milton Mallawarachchi and M. S. Fernando
 Ekamath Eka Rataka Ea Kale Enakota Enawa Hina Wevi (Nadayo) Enna Enna Wadiwenna Gaha Kola Mal - with H.R Jothipala
 Gaja Labai Nona Mahathune (Pacha) Galkisse Muhudu Werale Galu Muwadora Pitiye (Dahas Gananakin) Ganu Parane Mawwe Deyyo Gigiri Jagari Handawana Giri Goris Handa Mama Udin Indi Gaha Yata Wadiwela Ipadunu Rata Daya Irida Pole Domba Gaha Yata Jack Saha Jil Kamatha Gawa' - with Nirosha Virajini
 Kaputulanthe Wasiyo Kawadawath Na Mehema Deyak Kawuda Gona (Oon Maru Hathara Hina) Kawuda Me Ane - with Kalawathee
 Kewilige Patiya (Kaputige Kooduwe) Lagadi Papai Nondi Jimai Lokaya Namathi Game Maduruwathi (Keen Koon Hangi Hangi) Maha Kaleka Benayaka (Naga Rajaya) Maha Kelaye Nuga Sewane (Bakamuna) Mamai Motta Pala Mame Me Bakamuna - with H.R Jothipala
 Mangala Athupita Sarasi Mayam Mawala Pala Me Danno Danithi Mini Gejji Handana My Name Is Saiman Silva Naga Rajaya (Maha Kalayaka Benayaka) Nandamma Na Nedo - with Srilal Abeykoon
 Nikamma Inna Wadata Adanna (Pin Batha) Nitharama Biruwata Ballek Oba Raja Weela - with Kalawathee
 Onna Babo Billo Enawa Or Mister Pana Palayan Labana Sumane Pankiriththa Parana Coat Parawiya Wage Raja Malige Pata Sarungal Wagei - with Vijaya Kumaranatunga
 Princy Darling My Sweety Raigamayanani Gampolayanani Raja Umbane Gona Rakinna Kiyala Aran Thibba Ran Thatiyaka Kiri Pani Purawala Rupiyal Lakshayak Thagi Salli Labenakota Sando Gundo (Kalayakin Nowa Munagahune) Sopinath Ekka Man Surangani Surangani Thamath Innawa (Vijaya Kuwenila) Thangamani - with Kalawathee
 Thea Kude Pite Badan Tikiri Kirilliyo Topsina Premi Mage Upan Dine Langa Ena Hinda Vikara Loke Loka Vikare Wadath Agei Hadath Penei - with Gration Ananda
 Weda Mahaththaya Wella Simbimin Rali Perale Yakada Kate - with Anjaleen Gunathilaka
 Yantham Athi Yantham English Dana GaththaReferences

External linksජනප්‍රිය නළුවා ලෙස කිරැළ පලන් විකට නළුවා Yesteryear Sinhala film comediansFreddie Silva no more Freddie's fries මේ දරුවාගේ පියා කවදා හරි රජ වෙනවාජනේෂ් සිල්වා ගැන දුක හිතෙන ආරංචියක්''

1938 births
2001 deaths
20th-century Sri Lankan male singers
People from Moratuwa
Sri Lankan Roman Catholics
Sri Lankan male film actors
Sinhalese singers